Kai O'Donnell (born 21 February 1999) is an Australian professional rugby league footballer who plays as a  forward for the Leigh Leopards in the Betfred Super League.

Background
Born in Brisbane, Queensland, O'Donnell played his junior rugby league for the Proserpine Brahmans and attended Proserpine State High School before being signed by the Gold Coast Titans. While on the Gold Coast, he attended Palm Beach Currumbin State High School.

Playing career
In 2015, O'Donnell played for the Mackay Cutters Cyril Connell Cup side. In 2017, he played for the Burleigh Bears Mal Meninga Cup side and moved up to their Hastings Deering Colts side in 2018. Later in 2018, O'Donnell made his debut for the Bears' Queensland Cup side. 

In February 2019, O'Donnell came off the bench in the Gold Coast Titans pre-season trial loss to the North Queensland Cowboys.

2020
In February, O'Donnell was a member of the Raiders' NRL Nines squad.

In round 9 of the 2020 NRL season, O'Donnell made his NRL debut for Canberra against the Melbourne Storm.

In round 20, he scored his first try in the top grade during a 38-28 victory over Cronulla-Sutherland at Kogarah Oval.

References

External links
Canberra Raiders profile
NRL profile

1999 births
Living people
Australian rugby league players
Australian expatriate sportspeople in England
Burleigh Bears players
Canberra Raiders players
Leigh Leopards players
Mount Pritchard Mounties players
Rugby league second-rows
Rugby league players from Brisbane